This article shows the qualification phase for the 2020–21 CEV Champions League. 18 teams will play in the qualification round. The two remaining teams will join the other 18 teams automatically qualified to the League round based on the European Cups' Ranking List. All 16 eliminated teams will compete in the 2020–21 CEV Cup.

Participating teams
The Drawing of Lots took place on 21 August 2020 in Luxembourg City.

First round
 18 teams compete in the first round
 The teams are split into 6 groups, each one featuring three teams
 Winner of each pool advance to the second round 

All times are local.

Pool A
(H): Tournament host

|} 

|}

Pool B
(H): Tournament host

|}

|}

Pool C
(H): Tournament host

|}

|}

Pool D
(H): Tournament host

|}

|}

Pool E
(H): Tournament host

|}

|}

Pool F
(H): Tournament host

|}

|}

Second round
 6 teams compete in the second round
 The teams are split into 2 groups, each one featuring three teams
 Winner of each pool advance to the League round

All times are local.

Pool G
(H): Tournament host

|}

|}

Pool H
(H): Tournament host

|}

|}

Notes

References

Qualification
CEV Champions League qualification